Sumalia zulema, the scarce white commodore, is a species of nymphalid butterfly found in tropical and subtropical Asia.

External links

References

Limenitidinae
Fauna of Pakistan
Butterflies of Asia
Taxa named by Henry Doubleday
Butterflies described in 1848